Gompholobium foliolosum is a species of flowering plant in the family Fabaceae and is endemic to eastern Australia. It is an erect shrub with pinnate leaves and orange-red, pea-like flowers.

Description

Taxonomy and naming
Gompholobium foliolosum was first formally described in 1837 by George Bentham in Thomas Mitchell's Journal of an Expedition into the Interior of Tropical Australia. The specific epithet (foliolosum) means "leafy".

Distribution
Fern-leaved burtonia grows in Queensland and in the Coonabarabran area in New South Wales.

References

foliolosum
Flora of New South Wales
Flora of Queensland
Plants described in 1848
Taxa named by George Bentham